The Palace Theatre is a historic  movie house located at 305 Mason Avenue, Cape Charles, Virginia, United States. It currently functions as a performing arts venue.

History 
Built in 1941, the Palace Theatre originally served as a movie house. The building was designed by the German-born architect Alfred M. Lublin, an admirer of Gropius.

Current use 
On July 7, 1998, the non-profit organization Arts Enter acquired the theatre to use for arts and cultural events and education. In addition, Arts Enter commenced a renovation project to restore the theatre to its original condition.

Notes

Art Deco architecture in Virginia
Cinemas and movie theaters in Virginia
Music venues in Virginia
Buildings and structures in Northampton County, Virginia
Tourist attractions in Northampton County, Virginia
1941 establishments in Virginia